Gil Roberts (born March 15, 1989) is an American athlete who specializes in the 200 m and  400 m. He competed for Texas Tech under coach Wes Kittley at the NCAA level. He was a member of the USA team that won the gold medal in the Men's 4×400 metres relay at the 2012 IAAF World Indoor Championships. Roberts won the 2014 US Outdoor championship in 44.53 on June 28 in Sacramento, California.

While competing at the 2016 Summer Olympics, Roberts won an Olympic gold medal in the 4 × 400 m relay. Another Texas Tech athlete, Michael Mathieu won bronze in the same event competing for the Bahamas.

References

External links
 
 
 
 
 
 

1989 births
Living people
American male sprinters
Texas Tech Red Raiders men's track and field athletes
Track and field athletes from Oklahoma
Athletes (track and field) at the 2016 Summer Olympics
Medalists at the 2016 Summer Olympics
Olympic gold medalists for the United States in track and field
Sportspeople from Oklahoma City
World Athletics Championships athletes for the United States
World Athletics Championships medalists
USA Outdoor Track and Field Championships winners
USA Indoor Track and Field Championships winners
World Athletics Indoor Championships winners